Dwell may refer to:

 Dwell (album), a 2020 album by Recondite
 Dwell (magazine), a monthly American publication focused on modern architecture and design
 Dwell (retailer), a leading UK furniture and accessories company
 "Dwell" (song), a 2020 song by Odette
 Dwell angle meter, an instrument used to tune ignition systems
 "Dwell", a song by Recondite from the 2020 album Dwell
 Dwell Community Church, a non-denominational cell church system in Columbus, Ohio

See also
 Dweller (disambiguation)
 Dwell time (disambiguation)
 Dwelling